Jan Stefan Wydżga (c.1610 – 6 September 1685) was a Polish priest and historian. He was Archbishop of Gniezno and Primate of Poland (1679-1685). He was born in the Lviv, and was pastor  of the Lviv cathedral chapter in 1641. He was Bishop of Łuck in the years 1655-1659, Bishop of Warmia 1659-1679, Grand Chancellor Crown Deputy Chancellor, Chancellor of the Queen of Poland, Ludwika Maria Gonzaga in 1652, Abbot of Sieciechów in 1647.
As a senator, he was present at the Seyms: 1659, 1661, 1662, 1664/1665, 1666 (I), 1668 (III), 1672 (I) and 1674 (II) [4].

References

External links
 Virtual tour Gniezno Cathedral  
List of Primates of Poland 

Gniezno
Chancellors of Poland
Archbishops of Gniezno